Kevin Krawietz and Andreas Mies were the defending champions and successfully defended their title, defeating Mate Pavić and Bruno Soares in the final, 6–3, 7–5.

Seeds

Draw

Finals

Top half

Section 1

Section 2

Bottom half

Section 3

Section 4

Other entry information

Wild cards

Withdrawals
  Alejandro Davidovich Fokina /  Fernando Verdasco (Verdasco withdrew after testing positive for COVID-19)
  Denys Molchanov /  Andrey Rublev (Rublev withdrew while still competing in Hamburg and opting to focus on singles match)

Alternate pairs

References

Men's Doubles
French Open by year – Men's doubles
French Open - Men's Doubles